Five Nations Golf Club is located in the village of , near Marche-en-Famenne, Belgium.
Its name was chosen because of its central position close to Germany, Luxembourg, France, The Netherlands and Belgium.

The 18-hole, par 72 course was designed by Gary Player. The "front nine" is a promenade in the forest while the "back nine" looks like a links.

Many holes are surrounded by water hazards and by thick roughs that make the course somewhat difficult for the visitor.

In addition to the driving range, it has a 3-hole practice course composed of two par-3 and one par-4.

Sources
Five Nations's EGA handicap table

External links
Five Nations' Official Website
Five Nations' Golfers Club

Golf clubs and courses in Belgium
1990 establishments in Belgium
Sports venues in Namur (province)